MFM Mirante Fund Management SA (MFM,) previously known as IFP Fund Management, is an independent asset management firm created by Giuseppe Mirante in 2003. The company's main office is in Lausanne, Switzerland. MFM currently has four fund profiles. The firm is headquartered in Lausanne, with a branch in Zurich.

History 
In October 2003, MFM established its first public fund, MFM Global Convertible Bonds (CHF), with the Swiss Franc as its reference currency. In April 2005, MFM Mirante Fund Management added a second type of EUR for the MFM Global Convertible Bonds.

In February 2008, the company opened a branch in Zurich to  serve the German-speaking community of Europe.

In July 2008, the Swiss Federal Banking Commission granted MFM Mirante Fund Management Asset Manager status. At the end of that year, following the correction in the financial markets, the company launched a fund mainly based on the yield and credit aspects of convertible bonds, called MFM Convertible Bonds Opportunities.

Six years later, the firm chose a new custodian bank, Pictet, as well as a new fund management company, FundPartner Solutions SA.

In 2009 and in 2013, MFM Global Convertible Bonds (CHF) fund won the Refinitiv Lipper Fund Award in the "Bond Convertible Global" category.

In 2014, MFM Global Thematic Long/Short was created and managed by a frequent spokesman of Bloomberg and CNBC.

In 2015, all MFM FUND's Swiss funds were transferred to MFM Funds (Lux), SICAV Luxembourg.

References

External links
 Official website

Financial services companies established in 2003
Investment management companies of Switzerland
Companies based in Lausanne
Swiss companies established in 2003